Sultan Karimov (Sultan Kárimov), (born 13 September 1993) better known by his stage name Farleon, is a Kazakh electronic musician, record producer, remixer and DJ.

In the second half of 2012 he entered the scene with his EP "Millenium", which entered top five releases of the week on Beatport. In 2016, his single "Tell Me" caught an eye of Don Diablo, who subsequently signed his collaboration with Dropgun "Fever" to Hexagon.

Discography
Only singles & remixes released since January 2015 are listed below:

Singles
 2016: "Tell Me" (featuring Jason Gaffner) [Independent Release] 
 2016: "Fever" (with Dropgun) [HEXAGON] 
2017: "Encore" [Showland (Armada Music)] 
2017: "Ultraviolet" (featuring LeyeT) [Red Lake]
2017: "Get Up" (featuring Or Barak) [Showland (Armada Music)]
2017: "Stop Signs" (featuring Jason Gaffner) [Armada Music] 
2017: "Satellite" (featuring Raikhana Mukhlis) [Independent Release]
2021: "10 000 Hours" (featuring Dan Berk, Adam Christopher) [© Dan+Shay, Justin Bieber | ℗ MUZA Records]

Remixes
 2015: I Am Harlequin - "Dance With Anyone" (Farleon Remix) [FREE]
 2016: Ember Island - "Can't Feel My Face" (Farleon Remix) [FREE]
 2016: Calvin Harris feat. Ayah Marar - "Thinking About You" (Farleon Remix) [FREE]
 2017: Jason Gaffner - "When The Sun Goes Down" (Farleon Remix) [Independent Release]
 2017: Shallows - "Matter" (Farleon Remix) [Caption Records (Sony Music)]

Production Credits
 2018: Raikhana Mukhlis - "a call". [Independent Release]
 2018: Raikhana Mukhlis - "Roses" [Independent Release]
 2018: Raikhana Mukhlis - "Lonely" [Independent Release]
 2018: Raikhana Mukhlis - "Trouble" [Independent Release]
 2018: Raikhana Mukhlis - "Believe" [Independent Release]
 2018: Raikhana Mukhlis - "W.E" [Independent Release]
 2019: Raikhana Mukhlis - "OMO" [DNK Music]
 2019: Raikhana Mukhlis - "ШРАМЫ" [DNK Music]
 2019: Raikhana Mukhlis - "На 2" [DNK Music]
 2019: Raikhana Mukhlis - "Потерять Себя" [DNK Music]
 2020: Raikhana Mukhlis - "Розы" [DNK Music]
 2021: abdr. - "Голой" [Zion Music]
 2021: abdr. - "WDYL?" [Zion Music]
 2021: abdr. - "Мое" [Zion Music]
 2021: abdr. - "Касания" [Coca-Cola x õzen]
 2021: Raikhana Mukhlis - "Проще" [1mp]

References

External links
 
 

Remixers
Kazakhstani DJs
Living people
People from Almaty
1993 births